In the automotive industry, rebadging is a form of market segmentation used by automobile manufacturers around the world. To allow for product differentiation without designing or engineering a new model or brand (at high cost or risk), a manufacturer creates a distinct automobile by applying a new "badge" or trademark (brand, logo, or manufacturer's name/make/marque) to an existing product line.

Rebadging is also known as rebranding and badge engineering; the latter is an intentionally ironic misnomer, in that little or no actual engineering takes place. The term originated with the practice of replacing an automobile's emblems to create an ostensibly new model sold by a different maker. Changes may be confined to swapping badges and emblems, or may encompass minor styling differences, as with cosmetic changes to headlights, taillights, front and rear fascias, and outer body skins. More extreme examples involve differing engines and drivetrains. The objective is "to spread the huge development costs of a new vehicle over as many cars as possible." An example is General Motors' rebadging of the Camaro as the Firebird, a successful model from the 1960s through to the 2000s. In most cases, consumers are interested in each brand's focus "on the unique elements of styling and driving characteristics." Some cars would not be marketed without the cost savings that are obtained from this practice and carmakers can develop many "different models – all wearing different badges – off the one platform."

In several countries including Japan, manufacturers often use the phrase "OEM supply" or "OEM-supplied" to denote vehicles that are a rebadged model from or for other manufacturers.

Although platform sharing can often involve rebadging and rebranding, it can also extend further, as the design may be used across multiple configurations. For example, a single platform may underpin a sedan, hatchback, or SUV/CUV body designs.

Automotive industry rebadging can be compared with white-label products in other consumer goods industries, such as consumer electronics and power tools.

History
The first case of badge engineering appeared in 1917 with the Texan automobile assembled in Fort Worth, Texas, that made use of Elcar bodies made in Elkhart, Indiana.

"Probably the industry's first example of one car becoming another" occurred in 1926 when Nash Motors' newly introduced smaller-sized Ajax models were discontinued in 1926 after over 22,000 Ajax cars were sold during the brand's inaugural year. The chairman and CEO of the company, Charles W. Nash, ordered that the Ajax models be marketed as the "Nash Light Six", Nash being a known and respected automobile brand. Production was stopped for two days so Nash emblems, hubcaps, and radiator shells could be exchanged on all unshipped Ajax cars. Conversion kits were also distributed at no charge to Ajax owners to transform their cars and protect the investment they had made in purchasing an automobile made by Nash.

Starting with the beginning of General Motors in 1909, chassis and platforms were shared with all brands. GMC, which historically was a truck builder, began to offer its products branded as Chevrolet, and vehicles produced by GM were built on common platforms shared with Chevrolet, Oakland, Oldsmobile, Buick, and Cadillac. Exterior appearances were gradually upgraded between these vehicle brands. This was partly due to the fact that all bodywork was provided by Fisher Body which was bought by GM in 1925 and the introduction of the Art and Color Section in 1928 directed by Harley Earl. For the 1958 model year, GM was promoting its fiftieth year of production, and introduced anniversary models for each brand; Cadillac, Buick, Oldsmobile, Pontiac, and Chevrolet. The 1958 models shared an almost identical appearance on all models for each brand, and made special luxury models with a shared appearance; Cadillac Eldorado Seville, Buick Limited Riviera, Oldsmobile Starfire 98, Pontiac Bonneville Catalina, and the Chevrolet Bel-Air Impala.

A later example was Wolseley Motors after it was bought out by William Morris. After World War I, "Wolseley started to lose its identity and eventually succumbed to badge engineering." This was repeated with the consolidation of Austin Motor Company and the Nuffield Organization (parent company of Morris Motors) to form the British Motor Corporation (BMC). The rationalization of production to gain efficiencies "did not extend to marketing" and each "model was adapted, by variation in trim and accessories, to appeal to customer loyalties for whom the badge denoting the company of origin was an important selling advantage ... 'Badge Engineering', as it became known, was symptomatic of a policy of sales competition between the constituent organizations." The ultimate example of BMC badge engineering was the 1962 BMC ADO16 which was available badged as a Morris, MG, Austin, Wolseley, Riley and the upmarket Vanden Plas. A year earlier the Mini was also available as Austin, Morris, Riley, and Wolseley – the latter two having slightly bigger boots.

Examples

Regional brands 
Badge engineering often occurs when an individual manufacturer (such as the regional Big Threes of the United States, Europe, and Japan) owns a portfolio of different brands and markets the same car under different brands and nameplates. The practice is used for multiple reasons. In one example, a company may do so to expand its range of different brands in a market without the cost of developing completely new models. In the United States, General Motors may sell a car through each of its brands; for example, the Chevrolet Tahoe, GMC Yukon, and Cadillac Escalade each share a common body.

In another example, the same model is rebadged when it is sold in different regions and markets. In Australia, during the 1980s and 1990s, the Button car plan required imported Nissans and Toyotas to adopt Ford and Holden (GM) nameplates. In the United Kingdom, Opel-produced vehicles are marketed under the Vauxhall brand; when sold in the United States, Opels were marketed as Saturns, Chevrolets, and Buicks. Conversely, the Australian Holden brand was never sold in North America, but the Holden Monaro and Holden Commodore were sold under the Pontiac (Pontiac GTO, Pontiac G8), Chevrolet (Chevrolet SS), and Buick (Buick Regal Sportback/Buick Regal TourX) nameplates.

Brand expansion 
Another way badge engineering may occur is when two separate manufacturers trade products, thereby filling gaps in their respective product lineups. During the 1990s, Honda and Isuzu entered into such an agreement, with Isuzu marketing the first-generation Honda Odyssey as the Isuzu Oasis as its first minivan. In return, Honda received the Isuzu Rodeo and Isuzu Trooper SUVs, which became the Honda Passport and Acura SLX; the agreement allowed both Honda and Isuzu to enter new vehicle segments without the cost of engineering an all-new vehicle design (at the same time, in Europe, the Honda Crossroad was a rebadged Land Rover Discovery).

During the late 2000s and early 2010s, the Volkswagen Routan was a rebranded version of the Dodge Grand Caravan, supplied as Volkswagen sought to re-enter the North American minivan segment without the investment of federalizing its own design. Assembled by Chrysler with a Chrysler powertrain, the Routan received its own styling and content features as well as a standard "sportier suspension and steering."

Distribution networks (Japan) 
In Japan, automobile manufacturers differed in the marketing of their product ranges. In contrast to marketing a single vehicle under multiple brand names (with minor changes to exterior bodywork), Japanese manufacturers marketed vehicles through multiple sales networks, with a distinct vehicle being sold under multiple model nameplates (from a single manufacturer).

Toyota marketed the Corolla in Japan exclusively at Toyota Corolla Store locations; at Toyota Auto Store locations, it was named the Toyota Sprinter. Nissan sold the Nissan Cedric through its Nissan Bluebird Store network, with the identical Nissan Gloria through the Nissan Prince Store network. Honda previously marketed the Honda Accord through multiple sales networks, marketing the Accord through the Honda Clio network and renaming it as the Honda Vigor for Honda Verno locations (conversely, the Vigor was renamed the Honda Inspire for the Clio network).

The practice of producing multiple versions of the same vehicle would eventually lead to distinct vehicles produced for export. In North America, the Toyota Sprinter was marketed as the Chevrolet Nova (and the Geo Prizm that replaced it). The Honda Vigor and Inspire were marketed as the Acura Vigor and TL; Nissan sold the Gloria in the United States as the Infiniti M45.

Joint ventures 
Two different automakers can also pool resources by operating a joint venture to create a product, then selling it each as their own. For example, General Motors and Toyota formed NUMMI. The vehicles produced from this venture (though not necessarily at NUMMI itself) included the Toyota Sprinter/Chevrolet Prizm, and later the Toyota Matrix/Pontiac Vibe. In another agreement, Ford and Nissan developed and produced the Mercury Villager and Nissan Quest minivans from 1993 through 2002.

Another example was the cooperative work between Volkswagen and Ford to develop the VW Sharan, Ford Galaxy, and SEAT Alhambra.

Badge engineering may occur when one company allows another, otherwise unaffiliated, company to market a revised version of their product through an OEM deal, as with Volkswagen marketing a revised version of the Dodge Caravan and Chrysler Town and Country minivans as the Volkswagen Routan (2009–2014).

Another example was the joint venture of Mitsubishi and Chrysler that resulted in vehicles produced by Diamond-Star Motors that were marketed under various nameplates from 1985 until 1993.

China 
In China, foreign manufacturers were required to form a joint venture with a local manufacturer to manufacture automobiles in the country. Prior to 2022, the Chinese government dictates that no more than two joint ventures are allowed for each foreign investor. Larger foreign manufacturers often set up two joint ventures to maximize the market reach, including Toyota (FAW Toyota and GAC Toyota), Ford (JMC-Ford and Changan Ford), Volkswagen (SAIC-VW and FAW-VW) and Honda (Dongfeng Honda and Guangqi Honda). To distribute the production and sales rights to each joint venture, manufacturers often resort to a similar strategy deployed in Japan, which is simply producing the same model under two different names with minor changes to exterior bodywork.

GAC Toyota has produced the Levin as a twin model to the FAW Toyota-built Corolla, and the Wildlander as the alternative to the RAV4. Honda awarded several models to two joint ventures, which spawned the Breeze from the original CR-V, the Elysion from the Odyssey, the XR-V from the HR-V, and others.

In other cases, foreign manufacturers may also rebadge a model developed by its partner, sometimes for exports to other markets. Examples include the second generation Chevrolet Captiva which is an export version of the Baojun 530 made by SAIC-GM-Wuling, or the Ford Territory, a reworked version of the Yusheng S330 developed by Jiangling Motors (JMC).

Life cycle extension 
Badge engineering could be used as a strategy to lengthen the life cycle of a vehicle. After a product had reached the end of its life cycle, it may be transferred to another brand, mostly from the same holding company or joint venture. Examples include the SEAT Exeo, a rebadged Audi A4 B7 with reworked styling, which was built in Spain from used production tooling from the Audi plant in Ingolstadt after the A4 B7 production has ended. The tooling was dismantled from Ingolstadt and was sent to the SEAT manufacturing plant in Martorell, Spain to be re-installed.

Another example is the Dongfeng Fengdu MX6 which was produced after the near-identical Nissan X-Trail (T31) production has ended, and the Maruti Suzuki Zen Estilo, which is based on the then-recently discontinued Suzuki MR Wagon. The advantage of this strategy is amortized tooling costs, which meant the vehicle can be produced at a higher margin of profit (or a lower price, or both).

Luxury vehicles
Badge engineering occurs in the luxury-type market segments. An automobile manufacturer will use a model from its mainstream brand as a basis for a model under a premium marque by upgrading its features, technology, and/or styling. Along with visible cosmetic differences, premium models may also receive upgraded drivetrains.

An example of this is that Ford Motor Company marketed its mainstream Ford Fusion mid-size sedan as the Lincoln MKZ; the Ford Expedition SUV is sold as the Lincoln Navigator. A more controversial example was the Aston Martin Cygnet, a rebadged version of the Toyota iQ city car (intended to comply with EU emissions regulations). While fitted with model-specific trim and a luggage set, the Cygnet nearly tripled the price of the iQ.

Platform sharing 
Along with rebadging and badge engineering, platform sharing is a common practice throughout the automotive industry. Alongside a shared chassis (though unibody construction is nearly universal in cars and also in many light trucks), platform sharing also standardizes components such as drivetrain, suspensions, components, and other technologies. General Motors used the B platform for many of its non-Cadillac full-size vehicles (nearly exclusively from 1959 through 1985), while Chrysler used its B platform for intermediates and its C platform for (non-Imperial) full-size cars.

The Volkswagen Group uses platform sharing as its business strategy in order to improve its profitability and growth. For example, Audi uses components from their more pedestrian counterparts, sold as Volkswagen mass-market brands. As an effort to place Audi as a "premium" marque, Volkswagen often introduces new technologies in Audi-branded cars before fitting them to mainstream products (such as the Direct-Shift Gearbox). In production, platform sharing is used extensively, with the modular MQB platform underpinning a range of vehicles from the Audi A1 to the Volkswagen Atlas. The previous D platform of the 2000s was used for the Volkswagen Phaeton and Bentley Continental GT (built in steel) and the Audi A8 (built in aluminum).

In the Japanese automotive industry, platform sharing has been used to expand model offerings in North America. While the initial Lexus LS was developed specifically for the American market, the later Lexus ES has shared a platform (but not a body) with the Toyota Camry (since 2013, the Toyota Avalon, itself also based on the Camry). Largely exclusive to North America, Honda uses a common platform to produce the American version of the Odyssey minivan, also underpinning the Honda Pilot and Honda Passport SUVs, the Acura MDX CUV, and the Honda Ridgeline mid-size pickup truck.

Problems and controversy
Although intended to save development costs by spreading design and research costs over several vehicles, rebadging can also become problematic if not implemented properly. The use of multiple car brands under a single-parent manufacturer can greatly increase selling costs. As each model line must be marketed separately, requiring a distinct dealership network. Inappropriate use of rebadging can also hurt overall sales by resulting in "cannibalism" between two or more brands owned by the same company by failing to develop a distinct image for each brand or by allowing the market failure of one version of a model to carry over to its rebadged model counterparts.

Through the 2000s, the American Big Three automakers reduced their brand footprint by closing or selling underperforming brands. After 2001, Chrysler discontinued its Plymouth brand (following the closure of Eagle in 1998). In response to the late 2000s recession, Ford ended its ownership of Jaguar, Land Rover, Aston Martin, and Volvo Cars; in 2010, Mercury was closed by Ford. General Motors underwent several brand revisions; following the discontinuation of the Geo sub-brand of Chevrolet in 1997, Oldsmobile was closed after 2004 (the oldest American nameplate at the time). Following its 2009 bankruptcy, GM closed Pontiac, Saturn, and Hummer in 2010; Saab was sold (eventually leading to its demise). In 2017, GM sold its European Opel and Vauxhall brands to PSA (now Stellantis).

GM X/H platform compacts 
In response to the 1973 oil crisis, General Motors began to expand fuel-efficient offerings beyond its Chevrolet division, reintroducing compact cars to its Buick, Oldsmobile, and Pontiac brands. Derived from the X-platform Chevrolet Nova, the Pontiac Ventura was introduced for 1971, with the Buick Apollo and Oldsmobile Omega introduced for 1973. These four X-platform vehicles (also known as N-O-V-A from the first letters of their model names) were produced with identical bodies with divisional differences marked only with specific grille, lamp, and body trim variations.

To expand its footprint in the subcompact segment, the H-body Chevrolet Vega platform was used for the 1975 model year for newly styled variants sold as the Chevrolet Monza, Buick Skyhawk and Oldsmobile Starfire followed by the 1976 Pontiac Sunbird. Similarly, to the X-body vehicles, the H-body subcompacts shared common bodies across all four divisions with differing grille, lamp, and body trim variations.

GM divisional engines 
Prior to 1981, the majority of General Motors vehicles were produced with engines designed by their respective divisions. From 1981 onward, GM ended its policy of divisionally-developed engines, instead offering engines under a singular GM brand. As an exception, Cadillac offers division-exclusive engines (the Northstar and Blackwing V8 engine families).

In 1981, GM lost a 1977 lawsuit related to consumers (who purchased 1977 Oldsmobile Delta 88s equipped with a 350 cubic-inch Chevrolet small-block engine instead of the 350 cubic-inch Oldsmobile V8 engine). At the time of production, GM had downsized its full-size model lines in preparation for another oil crisis and had increased production of V6 engines as the intended standard engine, underestimating consumer demand for Oldsmobile V8 engines. To accommodate the increased market demand, nearly 60% of Delta 88s were equipped with a Chevrolet 5.7L V8 for 1977. The lawsuit was filed by the state of Illinois, claiming GM falsely advertised the vehicles. In 1981, GM settled the lawsuit with the vehicle buyers and discontinued their company-unique policy of division-specific engines. Into the 1990s, GM advertising featured a disclaimer stating '"Oldsmobiles (or any other GM division) are equipped with engines manufactured by various GM divisions, subsidiaries and affiliates worldwide."'

Lincoln Versailles and Cadillac Cimarron 

Prior to the mid-1970s, the American luxury brands Lincoln and Cadillac offered model lines entirely of full-size sedans. At the beginning of the decade, the BMW Bavaria/3.0Si, Jaguar XJ6/XJ12, and Mercedes-Benz S-Class (W116) began sale in North America, competing against American luxury brands in price. Sold as full-size sedans in Europe, the model lines were multiple feet shorter than the Cadillac Sedan de Ville and Lincoln Continental (both rivaling the Rolls-Royce Phantom V in length and width). In response to both the 1973 oil crisis and the introduction of European luxury sedans, Lincoln and Cadillac introduced smaller model offerings through the use of rebranding divisional counterparts, resulting in the most controversial uses of rebranding in automotive history.

For 1975, Cadillac introduced the Cadillac Seville (its smallest vehicle in over 40 years). Sharing its chassis with the Chevrolet Nova, the Seville received a restyled body, sharing no exterior commonality with its X-body counterpart. In a marketing decision that confused buyers, the Seville was the most expensive (non-limousine) Cadillac, negatively affecting sales.

In response to the Seville, Lincoln released the Lincoln Versailles compact sedan for 1977. The smallest Lincoln ever produced at the time, the Versailles was a rebranded version of the Mercury Monarch, adopting the features of the 1976 Mercury Grand Monarch Ghia. With the exception of its grille, hood, headlamps, taillamps, and trunk lid, nearly the entire body of the Versailles was shared with the Monarch sold in the same Lincoln-Mercury showroom (the Monarch also shared its body with the Ford Granada); the Versailles was also priced as the most expensive Lincoln sedan. Outsold by the Seville nearly three-to-one, the Versailles sold far under sales predictions and was discontinued early in the 1980 model year.

For the 1982 model year, Cadillac hurriedly introduced the Cadillac Cimarron subcompact sedan, giving neither engineers nor designers the budget or time to differentiate the Cadillac from the variants marketed by GM's four other brands. To compete against compact European executive sedans, marketed as compact luxury cars in North America, General Motors made few changes and rebranded its obviously related J platform four-door sedan as the Cimarron, developed and approved within less than one year.

Visually nearly identical to the others, the Cimarron was priced twice as high as its Chevrolet counterpart; for a lower price, a J-body vehicle from Chevrolet, Buick, Oldsmobile, and Pontiac could be equipped with nearly identical features as the Cimarron. Following the 1988 model year, Cadillac discontinued the Cimarron.

While the Lincoln Versailles was largely forgotten after its discontinuation, the Cimarron caused extensive damage to the Cadillac brand, which saw its market share cut nearly in half from the launch of the model line to a decade after its withdrawal. For the 1982 model year, the Lincoln Continental was repackaged as a mid-size sedan (later becoming a four-door counterpart of the Continental Mark VII, introduced for the 1984 model year), sharing no exterior body panels with any other Ford, Mercury, or Lincoln vehicle.

GM A-platform 
From 1982 to 1986, the front-wheel drive A platform underpinned the Chevrolet Celebrity, Cutlass Ciera, Pontiac 6000, and Buick Century. As part of their legacy, the A-bodies became enormously popular – as well as synonymous with one of GM's most transparent examples of badge engineering: they were simultaneously presented, almost indistinguishably, on the 22 August 1983 cover of Forbes magazine as examples of genericized uniformity, embarrassing the company and ultimately prompting GM to recommit to design leadership.

Eagle (Chrysler) 

In 1987, Chrysler Corporation acquired American Motors Corporation (AMC) from Renault, leading to the exit of the latter company from the North American market. As part of the sale, Chrysler obtained the AMC dealership network as well as the name from the AMC Eagle line of all-wheel drive models. For 1989, Chrysler established the Jeep-Eagle Division as a strategy to focus on Jeep and specialty models as well as to differentiate the brand from Chrysler's K-car-based models.

As the AMC Eagle Wagon was discontinued in 1988, the Eagle product line was introduced with Renault-designed vehicles developed prior to the sale of AMC (the Premier and Medallion). To expand the Eagle product line, Chrysler also introduced Eagle vehicles designed by Mitsubishi, including the Summit (rebranded Dodge/Plymouth Colt) and the Talon (rebranded Mitsubishi Eclipse), marketing Eagle towards consumers interested in imported vehicles.

For 1992, the Eagle Vision became the first Eagle-brand vehicle developed by Chrysler, replacing the Renault/AMC-developed Premier. Positioned between the Dodge Intrepid and Chrysler Concorde, the Eagle Vision shared most exterior trim with the Concorde and was the only Chrysler LH car offered exclusively with a 5-passenger interior.

Coinciding with the 1998 Daimler-Chrysler merger, the Eagle brand was discontinued; the singular Jeep brand was integrated as part of Chrysler or Dodge dealership networks. The Chrysler 300M was originally developed as a second generation of the Eagle Vision; following the discontinuation of Eagle, the vehicle continued into production as a Chrysler model, adopting a slightly restyled grille, Chrysler badging, and a Chrysler interior.

Lexus ES250 and Infiniti M30 

For the 1989 model year, Toyota and Nissan introduced the Lexus and Infiniti luxury brands in the United States (following the Acura luxury brand of Honda) with the Lexus LS400 and Infiniti Q45 full-size sedans. To expand beyond a single-vehicle model line, both brands rebranded existing models from the Japanese market produced by their parent companies to introduce an entry-level vehicle for the 1990 model year.

The Lexus ES250 is a four-door sedan that was developed from the Toyota Vista (also called the Toyota Camry Prominent). The ES250 strong visual resemblance to the American-market Toyota Camry was differentiated by the frameless side window door design as well as its unique grille, lower body trim, and road wheels while the interior had features from its LS400 counterpart.

The Infiniti M30 is a two-door notchback coupe, as Nissan rebranded its existing Nissan Leopard for sale in the United States; a two-door convertible was also sold (with the conversion done in the United States). With the exception of its badging and dashboard (sourced from the left-hand drive Nissan Skyline), the M30 differed from the Leopard primarily in its steering wheel placement.

Intended largely as placeholder models, the ES250 and M30 were largely overshadowed by their companion flagship sedans; both vehicles were withdrawn before the end of the 1992 model year (as their Japanese counterparts had ended their model cycles). Lexus replaced the ES250 with the ES300; while again sharing a body with a Japanese-market Toyota (the Toyota Vista/Windom), the ES300 bore no direct visual resemblance to the American-market Camry with which it shared its chassis and engine. Infiniti replaced the M30 coupe with the J30 four-door sedan (rebranded as the Nissan Leopard J Ferie in Japan).

Rover CityRover 

The Rover CityRover, launched in 2003 as the last vehicle from the MG Rover Group, was a rebadged Tata Indica made in India. English motoring journalist George Fowler criticized the MG Rover Group, which was enjoying national sympathy from the British public as the last domestically owned automobile manufacturer, stating the CityRover was "a duplicitous attempt to 'save Rover' by flogging an Indian car on which the only Rover bits were the badges."

Models produced under license
A variant of rebadging is licensing models to be produced by other companies, typically in another country. The earliest such vehicle was the Austin 7 (1922–1939), designed and built by Austin Motor Company and licensed to other manufacturers across continents which became their first-ever model. The Bantam in the US that would eventually build the first Jeep, BMW in Germany, and Nissan in Japan.

Among the post-war cars, the Fiat 124 designed and built by Fiat, Italy was licensed to various other manufacturers from different countries and became a dominant car in many Eastern Europe and West Asian countries.

The Morris Oxford Series IV built by Morris of England in 1955 would become Hindustan Ambassador in India and was manufactured until 2014. Another example of this is the British Hillman Hunter, which was license-built in Iran as the Paykan, as well as Naza, building vehicles under license from Kia and Peugeot (Naza 206 Bestari).

A similar example of licensed badge-engineered products would be the Volga Siber, a rebadged version of the Chrysler Sebring sedan and the Dodge Stratus sedan produced in Russia from 2008 until 2010.

See also
 Debadging
 List of badge-engineered vehicles
 Builder's plate
 White-label product

References

Automotive industry
Brand management
Product management